Lord Buddha TV is an Indian 24x7 Hindi and Marathi mainstream Ambedkarite and Navayana Buddhist channel with focus on Bahujan issues. It is headquartered in Nagpur,Maharashtra . In June 2018, its viewership was 25 million. It broadcasts daily programmes and documentaries on Buddha's teachings and his Dhamma. The Lord Buddha TV is available on more than 800 cable operators, DTH platforms as well as online.

History
Lord Buddha TV was launched on 26 November 2010 by Sachin Moon,Bhayaji khairkar and raju moon. Lord Buddha TV is a GEC channel with stated purpose of developing understanding and acceptance of the philosophy and the teachings of Gautam Buddha and Babasaheb Ambedkar. The viewership is all across India and in other countries which follow the ideology of the Buddha.

References

External links
Online Web Channel

Navayana
Buddhism in India
Buddhist television
Religious television channels in India
24-hour television news channels in India
Television channels and stations established in 2010
2010 establishments in India
Hindi-language television channels in India
Hindi-language television stations
Mass media companies of India
Entertainment companies of India
Buddhism in Maharashtra
Ambedkarite organisations